Mitnande Rural LLG (formerly Mount Wilhelm Rural LLG) is a local-level government (LLG) of Chimbu Province, Papua New Guinea.

Wards
01. Maglau/Wandigle
02. Maglau/Komkane 1
03. Maglau/Komkane 2
04. Maglau/Deglaku 1
05. Maglau
06. Maglau/Denglaku 2
07. Inaugl 1
08. Inaugl 2
09. Inaugl 3
10. Inaugl/Kunaiku
11. Inaugl 4
12. Kuglkane 1
13. Kuglkane 2
14. Kuglkane 3
15. Kuglkane 4
16. Kuglkane 5
17. Kuglkane 6

References

Local-level governments of Chimbu Province